Carol A. Murphy is an American Democratic Party politician, who has served in the New Jersey General Assembly since January 9, 2018.

Murphy served in the General Assembly as the Deputy Majority Leader from 2020 to 2021 and has been the Majority Whip since 2022.

New Jersey Assembly 
A resident of Mount Laurel, she has represented the 7th Legislative District in the New Jersey Assembly since 2018, replacing Troy Singleton, who relinquished his seat to successfully run for the New Jersey Senate. She was the first Assemblywoman to represent the 7th Legislative District in 20 years, with the last Assemblywoman for the district having been elected in 1995. She was also the first Democrat from Mount Laurel to ever serve in the State Legislature.

In 2020, she was one of the primary sponsors of Assembly Bill 4454 (now N.J.S.A. 18A:35-4.36a) which requires a curriculum diversity and inclusion to be included in the school curriculum for students in kindergarten through twelfth grade.

Committee assignments 
Committee assignments for the current session are:
Judiciary, Vice-Chair
Budget
Financial Institutions and Insurance

District 7 
Each of the 40 districts in the New Jersey Legislature has one representative in the New Jersey Senate and two members in the New Jersey General Assembly. The representatives from the 7th District for the 2022—23 Legislative Session are:
Senator Troy Singleton (D)
Assemblyman Herb Conaway (D)
Assemblywoman Carol A. Murphy (D)

Early life and career 
Murphy's father was an Army veteran and Bronze Star recipient who she credits as the reason she learned about the value of service. She was quoted as saying, "Like all of you, I’ve experienced tragedies and struggles. I want to be on the front lines during the toughest times, fighting for you in Trenton.”

Prior to her time in the Assembly, she held several jobs in the public sector, including serving as Community Relations Manager for the New Jersey Schools Development Authority, Chief of Staff to state Senator Linda R. Greenstein (District 14), and Director of Policy and Communication for Assemblywoman Gabriela Mosquera (District 4).

Electoral history

Assembly

References

External links
Legislative web page

Year of birth missing (living people)
Living people
Camden County College alumni
Democratic Party members of the New Jersey General Assembly
People from Mount Laurel, New Jersey
Politicians from Burlington County, New Jersey
21st-century American politicians